WNTE-LD, virtual channel 55 (UHF digital channel 30), branded on-air as Teleuniverso Puerto Rico, is a low-powered Spanish-language television station licensed to Mayaguez, Puerto Rico. The station serves the entire western area as a satellite of WVDO-LD and it is owned by Make Television Corporation. WNTE-LD maintains its transmitter at Monte del Estado in Maricao.

Digital television
WNTE-LD's digital signal is multiplexed:

References

External links

NTE-LD
Low-power television stations in the United States
Mayagüez, Puerto Rico
2013 establishments in Puerto Rico
Television channels and stations established in 2013